Kārlis Zilpaušs (2 May 1918 – 27 December 1944) was a Latvian professional ice hockey left wing who played for the Latvian national ice hockey team. At the age of 17, he played in the Latvian Championship for ASK Riga, and he appeared in the 1938 and 1939 Ice Hockey World Championships.

Personal life
Zilpaušs served in the Latvian Legion during the Second World War and was killed in the Soviet Union on 27 December 1944.

Career statistics

Club career

International career

References

1918 births
1944 deaths
Ice hockey people from Riga
Latvian ice hockey left wingers
Latvian Waffen-SS personnel
Latvian military personnel killed in World War II